The Norman Adrian Wiggins School of Law (also known as Campbell Law School or Campbell University School of Law) is a private law school in Raleigh, North Carolina, United States. Founded in 1976, the law school is one of six graduate programs  offered by Campbell University. The school is named after its founder, Norman Adrian Wiggins, former President and Chancellor of Campbell University, and creator of the institution's law division. Originally housed on the main campus of Campbell University in Buies Creek, the school moved to a newly constructed facility in downtown Raleigh in September, 2009.

Academics and bar passage rate
Campbell Law School offers nine different joint degree programs.

Admissions
For the class entering in 2022, Campbell Law accepted 55.71% of applicants and 37.77% of those accepted enrolled with the average enrollee having a 154 LSAT score and 3.53 undergraduate GPA.

Bar passage
For 2022 bar exams, Campbell Law's first-time pass rate was 75.51%. The ultimate bar passage rate for the class of 2020 after two years was 95.59%, out of 141 graduates 136 took the examination with 130 test-takers ultimately passing.

Employment 
According to Campbell's 2020 ABA-required disclosures, 78.57% of the Class of 2020 obtained full-time, long-term, J.D.-required or J.D.-advantage employment ten months after graduation.
Campbell Law class of 2020 has an unemployment rate of 6% according to ABA employment data.

According to the Department of Education, one year after graduation Campbell Law graduates had a median income of $44,508 and a median debt load of $140,880.

Costs
The total cost of attendance (indicating the cost of tuition, fees, and living expenses) at Campbell for the 2020-21 academic year is $73,300. Tuition and required fees are $46,230 for the 2020-21 academic year.

Notes

References

External links
 Official website

Campbell University
Law schools in North Carolina
Business schools in North Carolina
Educational institutions established in 1976
Educational institutions established in 1983
Universities and colleges in Raleigh, North Carolina
1976 establishments in North Carolina